Xerochlamys elliptica is a tree in the family Sarcolaenaceae. It is endemic to Madagascar.

Description
The tree's flowers are usually solitary or sometimes in inflorescences of two flowers, with white, or rarely pinkish, petals.

Distribution and habitat
Xerochlamys elliptica is only found in the central regions of Vakinankaratra and Amoron'i Mania.

Threats
Xerochlamys elliptica is threatened by deforestation due to wildfires and mining. No populations are currently within protected areas.

References

elliptica
Endemic flora of Madagascar
Trees of Madagascar
Plants described in 1915